Anna-Lena Grönefeld and Vania King were the defending champions, but Grönefeld decided not to participate this year.

King partnered with Barbora Záhlavová-Strýcová and successfully defended her title, defeating Sofia Arvidsson and Séverine Brémond Beltrame 6–1, 6–3 in the final.

Seeds

Draw

References
Main Draw

Challenge Bell
Tournoi de Québec
Can